Nea Magnisia, before 1927 known as Arapli, is a town and a community of the Delta municipality. Before the 2011 local government reform it was part of the municipality of Echedoros, of which it was a municipal district. The 2011 census recorded 4,266 inhabitants in the village. The community of Nea Magnisia covers an area of 14.805 km2.

See also
 List of settlements in the Thessaloniki regional unit

References

Populated places in Thessaloniki (regional unit)